Marinobacter arcticus is a bacterium from the genus of Marinobacter.

References

Further reading 
 

Alteromonadales
Bacteria described in 1992